BHR 71 is a small dark nebula in the constellation of Musca which is 600 light years from the Solar System. It has a diameter of about 1 light year.

Notes

Dark nebulae
Musca (constellation)